"Bum Bum" is a 2015 song by R&B singer Kat DeLuna featuring Trey Songz.

Bum Bum may also refer to:

Songs 
 "Bum Bum", a 2000 single by Italo dance group Mabel
 "Bum Bum", a 2015 single by soca artist Kevin Lyttle featuring Mya
 "Bum Bum", a 2018 single by afropop singer Yemi Alade
 "The Bum Bum Song" (1999), a shortened title of Tom Green's hit song Lonely Swedish

See also 
 Bum (disambiguation)
 Buttocks